Iochroma brevistamineum is a species of plant in the family Solanaceae. It is endemic to Ecuador.

References

brevistamineum
Flora of Ecuador
Data deficient plants
Taxonomy articles created by Polbot
Taxa named by Carl Lebrecht Udo Dammer